Fritz Crome  (6 May 1879 – 25 April 1948) was a Danish composer and music writer.

Biography
Fritz Crome was the son of August Crome, who founded the store Crom & Goldschmidt in Copenhagen. He started an engineering course at the Danish Polytechnic (DTU), but soon switched to music. He trained as a pianist with Louis Glass and later studied in Paris and Berlin. He was then employed at the Stern Conservatory in Berlin, while he worked as a music writer, both in Germany and Scandinavia. From 1925 until his death he was employed as a teacher at the Royal Danish Academy of Music.

Cromer's musical output was relatively small and conservative. It included all the songs that were inspired by Hugo Wolf, notably.

References
This article was initially translated from the Danish Wikipedia.

External links
 

Danish composers
Male composers
Writers about music
1879 births
Place of birth missing
1948 deaths
Place of death missing